Netball Europe (previously known as Federation of European Netball Associations) is the regional body within the International Federation of Netball Associations that governs netball across Europe. The European region has eleven full members and three associate members. Netball Europe runs the annual European Netball Championships for open, challenge and under-age sections.

Full Members
 England
 Gibraltar
 Isle of Man
 Israel
 Malta
 Northern Ireland
 Republic of Ireland
 Scotland
 Switzerland
 United Arab Emirates 
 Wales

Associate members
 Denmark
 France
 Sweden

References

    
Europe
Sports organizations established in 1990
1990 establishments in Europe
Sports governing bodies in Europe